Physalaemus biligonigerus is a species of frog in the family Leptodactylidae.
It is found in Argentina, Bolivia, Brazil, Paraguay, and Uruguay.
Its natural habitats are subtropical or tropical dry forests, temperate shrubland, subtropical or tropical dry shrubland, subtropical or tropical moist shrubland, temperate grassland, subtropical or tropical dry lowland grassland, subtropical or tropical seasonally wet or flooded lowland grassland, freshwater lakes, intermittent freshwater lakes, freshwater marshes, sandy shores, arable land, pastureland, plantations, rural gardens, urban areas, heavily degraded former forest, water storage areas, ponds, irrigated land, seasonally flooded agricultural land, and canals and ditches.

References 

biligonigerus
Taxonomy articles created by Polbot
Amphibians described in 1861